Starochukurovo (İśke Soqor) is a rural locality (a selo) in Bul-Kaypanovsky Selsoviet, Tatyshlinsky District, Bashkortostan, Russia. The population was 101 as of 2010. There are 5 streets.

Geography 
Starochukurovo is located 18 km northwest of Verkhniye Tatyshly (the district's administrative centre) by road. Mamatayevo is the nearest rural locality.

References 

Rural localities in Tatyshlinsky District